Portuguese–Sri Lankan relations refer to the bilateral relations between Portugal and Sri Lanka. While two countries do not have embassies in respective capitals, with Portugal only has an honorary consulate in Colombo, they share a long, close and historical relationship.

History

The Portuguese first arrived to Sri Lanka during the late 15th and early 16th century in the island. The Sri Lankan Sinhalese of the Kingdom of Kotte would soon clash with the Portuguese, in which the Sri Lankans were defeated and incorporated into Portuguese territory. Later the Sinhalese defeated the Portuguese in many battles and freed the central regions from Portuguese influence.  Portuguese only maintained control of the coastal regions and were convincingly defeated in more central kingdoms like Kandy and Seethawaka. The Portuguese rule, though only lasted for a century, left an influential legacy in the country, such as Portuguese naming of Sri Lankans, and the spread of Catholic Church in the country. Many modern Sri Lankan names can be traced from the Portuguese, and Catholics formed at least 7 to 10% of Sri Lankan population.

Modern relations
Owning the debt of such a long and historical tie, Sri Lanka and Portugal established relations following British departure from Ceylon.

Portugal provided unofficial support to Sri Lanka in its war against the Liberation Tigers of Tamil Eelam, though entirely non-lethal supports throughout the Sri Lankan Civil War.

Since 2010s, Sri Lanka and Portugal have increased bilateral relations, as part of re-introduction of Portuguese heritages in Sri Lanka.

Portugal condemned the brutal terrorist bombings of Easter Christians in Sri Lanka 2019, which a Portuguese citizen was among the dead.

See also
Foreign relations of Portugal
Foreign relations of Sri Lanka
Burgher people
Sri Lankan Portuguese creole
Portuguese conquest of the Jaffna kingdom

References

External links
Portuguese influence on ancient Sri Lanka

 
Sri Lanka
Portugal
Relations of colonizer and former colony